Seifeddine Makhlouf ((Arabic: سيف الدين مخلوف), born 12 August 1975) is a Tunisian lawyer and politician.

Makhlouf was elected to the Assembly of the Representatives of the People in 2019 and he is the spokesperson and parliamentary group leader of Dignity Coalition.

Makhlouf was the Dignity Coalition candidate for the 2019 Tunisian presidential election in which he gained 147,351 votes in the first round, or 4.37% of the vote.

In June 2022, he was sentenced to a year in prison for insulting a judge.

References

1975 births
Living people
Tunisian politicians
21st-century Tunisian lawyers
People from Tunis

21st-century Tunisian politicians
Tunisian criminals
Candidates for President of Tunisia